Lake Tuscaloosa is a reservoir in west-central Alabama, created by damming North River. It was constructed by Thornton Jones to provide water for Tuscaloosa residents and for industrial use as well. It was completed in 1970 at a cost of about $7,725,000. Since it is located just north of Tuscaloosa and Northport, the lake is also very popular for recreational activities.

History 
Lake Tuscaloosa was constructed in response to the rising population of Tuscaloosa, which began to consume more water than its two current reservoirs, Harris Lake and Lake Nicol, could provide. A dam was constructed on North River, flooding the area that would become Lake Tuscaloosa. In relation to the other two lakes, Lake Tuscaloosa became the most bountiful of the three, pushing Harris Lake to only handle industrial water and Lake Nicol for use as a backup. Currently, Lake Tuscaloosa's water is treated for human consumption as well as providing some industrial raw water.

References 

Reservoirs in Alabama
Reservoirs in Tuscaloosa County, Alabama
Alabama placenames of Native American origin